TNF receptor-associated factor (TRAF3) is a protein that in humans is encoded by the TRAF3 gene.

Function 

The protein encoded by this gene is a member of the TNF receptor associated factor (TRAF) protein family. TRAF proteins associate with, and mediate the signal transduction from, members of the TNF receptor (TNFR) superfamily. This protein participates in the signal transduction of CD40, a TNFR family member important for the activation of the immune response. This protein is found to be a critical component of the lymphotoxin-beta receptor (LTbetaR) signaling complex, which induces NF-kappaB activation and cell death initiated by LTbeta ligation. Epstein-Barr virus-encoded latent infection membrane protein-1 (LMP1) can interact with this and several other members of the TRAF family, which may be essential for the oncogenic effects of LMP1. Three alternatively spliced transcript variants encoding two distinct isoforms have been reported.

Interactions 

TRAF3 has been shown to interact with:

 CD27, 
 CD40, 
 Caspase 3 
 Lymphotoxin beta receptor, 
 Nucleoporin 62, 
 RANK, 
 TANK, and
 TNFSF14.

References

Further reading